South Hams Hospital is a health facility in Plymouth Road, Kingsbridge, Devon, England. It is managed by University Hospitals Plymouth NHS Trust and formerly by Torbay and South Devon NHS Foundation Trust.

History
The facility was opened by the Bishop of Exeter as the Kingsbridge, Salcombe and District Cottage Hospital in April 1929. In 1932, Emma José Townsend, a visitor to the hospital, was awarded the Empire Gallantry Medal for trying to prevent a farmer from murdering his son with a shotgun in one of the wards. It joined the National Health Service in 1948 and subsequently became known as South Hams Hospital.

References

Hospitals in Devon
NHS hospitals in England
Hospitals established in 1929
1929 establishments in England